Bhim Sena or Bheem Sena or Akhil Bhartiya Bhim Sena, abbreviated as ABBS, lit."All India Ambedkar Army", is an Ambedkarite social organization working for rights of Scheduled Castes, Scheduled Tribes, Other Backward Classes and religious minorities in India currently under national president, Nawab Satpal Tanwar. It works for protecting the Indian Constitution and reservation. The organisation is named after B. R. Ambedkar. Seema Chauhan is PRO of Bhim Sena.

Historical background
On 1 October 2010, Village Khandsa, Gurgaon, Haryana's Nawab Satpal Tanwar founded Bhim Sena as a volunteers corps, seeking self-defence and equality which asserted that dalits are mool bharatis (the original inhabitants of India). On 29 May 1972, on similar patterns Dalit Panthers was founded in Maharashtra. First ever dalit volunteer organization was Samata Sainik Dal formed in 1927 by B. R. Ambedkar. In 1907, Ayyankali Pada was created by dalit reformer Ayyankali in Kerala. As of 2018, Seema Chauhan is PRO of Akhil Bhartiya Bheem Sena.

References

External links
Official website

Dalit politics
2010 establishments in Haryana
Organizations established in 1968
Volunteer organisations in India
Ambedkarite organisations